The 2012–13 women's national hockey ice team represented Canada in various tournaments during the season. The team will attempt to win the gold medal at the Women's World Championships in Ottawa, Ontario. The head coach of the National team is York Lions women's ice hockey coach Dan Church.

News and notes

National team

2013 IIHF Worlds
Canada enters the 2013 IIHF Women's World Championship as the defending champion. The tournament shall serve as qualification for the 2015 competition. Canada is in the top division and will play all games at Scotiabank Place.

Schedule
All times are local (UTC−4).

Gold medal game

Under 18 team
August 12: Hockey Canada named the roster of the Canadian Under-18 team that will play a three-game exhibition series in Blaine, Minnesota against the United States Under-18 squad from August 16 to 19, 2012. Four of the players on the roster were with the Under-18 program that won the gold medal at the 2012 IIHF Under 18 Worlds.

Exhibition

Roster

Under 22 team
August 12: Hockey Canada named the roster of the Canadian Under-22 team that will play a three-game exhibition series in Calgary against the United States Under-22 squad from August 16 to 19, 2012. Four of the players on the roster were with the Under-18 program that won the gold medal at the 2012 IIHF Under 18 Worlds.
August 16: The Canadian Under-22 squad suffered their first loss to the United States in 13 games. The last win for the US came in Game 1 of a three game set in 2004.

Exhibition

Roster

Awards and honours

References

See also
 2010–11 Canada women's national ice hockey team
 2011–12 Canada women's national ice hockey team
 Canada women's national ice hockey team

National Ice Hockey Team, 2012-13
Canada women's national ice hockey team seasons